Be Ordinary is the first EP by South Korean singer-songwriter Hwang Chi-yeul, his first studio album in 10 years, released on 13 June 2017, since his debut album Five Senses in 2007.

Background and release
In March 2017, singer Hwang Chi-yeul said during an interview:

In June 2017 after the EP's release, Hwang said during an interview with KBS World Radio:

He explains what "A Daily Song" is about:

Be Ordinary describes nearly every aspect of his ordinary everyday life as a musician for the past 10 years he remained unknown. His last release as a studio full-length album was in 2007 with his album Five Senses. Be Ordinary is his first EP.

Promotion
Before the EP's release, Be Ordinary, a teaser video, was released on 9 June 2017. The EP and its official music video, were released on 13 June 2017 and EP consists of seven tracks with many different genres. He wrote the lyrics for the last song, "Alone".

On 24 May 2017, Hwang performed the song "A Daily Song" live for the first time on episode 16 of I Can See Your Voice, Season 4, that was broadcast on 15 June 2017 on Mnet.

On 23 June 2017, "A Daily Song" took first place in the fourth week of June 2017 on KBS Music Bank. The nominees for the Music Bank K-Chart first place were "A Daily Song" by Hwang Chi-yeul and "Untitled, 2014" by G-Dragon.

On 24–25 June 2017, Hwang held his first concert, Yolo Con at the Olympic Park in Seoul and performed his new songs from the EP live.

Hwang is scheduled to hold his solo showcase on 30 July 2017 in Taipei, and in concert on 10–11 August 2017 in Toronto.

Hwang occasionally performs songs from the EP acoustically on a live streaming channel V LIVE.

Track listing

Personnel
Source:

 Hwang Chi-yeul – vocals
 Kang Hwa-sung (David Kang) – piano, keyboards
 Shin Jeong-eun – keyboards, drums 
 Jeong Su-wan – guitar 
 Choi Hun – bass
 Han Gil – piano
 Park Shin-won – guitar
 Kang Tae-woo – backing vocals
 Yoon Young-bok – keyboards 
 Tommy Kim – guitar
 Bull$Eye – drums
 Son Jun-hyuk – backing vocals 
 ENIAC – piano, keyboards, drums 
 Kim Da-ham – piano, keyboards 
 Lee Gheun-hyung – guitar
 Jang Tae-woong – bass
 Super COO – drums
 Jeon Sang-hwan – piano, bass, drums
 Chung Soo-wan – guitar

Charts

Album

Weekly charts

Monthly charts

Half-Year charts

Year-end charts

Singles

Album sales

References

2017 EPs
Korean-language EPs